Lianshui County is under the administration of Huai'an, Jiangsu province, China. The northernmost county-level division of Huai'an, it borders the prefecture-level cities of Lianyungang to the north, Yancheng to the east, and Suqian to the west.

Administrative divisions
In the present, Lianshui County has 17 towns and 2 townships.
17 towns

2 townships
 Xuji
 Huangying

Climate

Notable persons
 Zhu Hailun

References

External links
Official website of Lianshui County government

County-level divisions of Jiangsu
Huai'an